The Annual Review of Linguistics is an annual peer-reviewed review journal published by Annual Reviews. It was established in 2015 and covers developments in the broad field of linguistics The founding co-editors were Barbara Partee and Mark Y. Liberman. Partee was succeeded in 2021 by Colin Phillips.

Abstracting and indexing

The journal is abstracted and indexed in Scopus, Social Sciences Citation Index, Linguistic Bibliography, Arts and Humanities Citation Index, and Modern Language Association Database. As of 2022, Journal Citation Reports gives the journal a 2021 impact factor of 3.705, ranking it eighteenth of 194  journals in the category "Linguistics (Social Science)".

See also
 List of linguistics journals

References

External links

 

Linguistics
Annual journals
Publications established in 2015
English-language journals
Linguistics journals